West Loch Estate is a census-designated place (CDP) in Honolulu County, Hawaii, United States.  The population was 5,523 at the 2020 census.

Geography

It is on the western shore of the West Loch of Pearl Harbor. Fort Weaver Road (Hawaii Route 76) is the main road, running north–south through the CDP.

Demographics

References

Census-designated places in Honolulu County, Hawaii
Populated coastal places in Hawaii